Alum is a species and class of chemical compound. Potassium alum, the prototypical member of the class, is often referred to simply as alum.

Alum may also refer to:
 Alum, Texas, a community in the US
 Alumnus, a graduate of a particular institution
 Alum Pot, a pothole in Simon Fell, North Yorkshire, England
 Ålum Runestones, four Viking age runestones located in Ålum, Denmark
 Robert Alum (died 1417), an English medieval bishop and university chancellor

See also
Allum, surname
Allums, surname
Alum Bay
Alum Creek (disambiguation)
Alum Rock (disambiguation)
Alum Springs (disambiguation)